Jean-Pierre Reveau (born 1932) is a French politician.

Early life
Jean-Pierre Reveau was born on 27 July 1932 in Paris, France.

Career
Reveau joined the National Front. He served as a member of the National Assembly representing the Rhône from 1986 to 1988.

In the 1990s, Reveau served as the treasurer of the National Front. He was excluded from the party in 2011.

References

1932 births
Living people
Politicians from Paris
National Rally (France) politicians
Party of France politicians
Deputies of the 8th National Assembly of the French Fifth Republic